The Falcon School Cyprus is an international school in Nicosia which follows an English-style curriculum, adapted to the Cyprus environment. Founded in 1976 and accredited by the Cyprus Ministry of Education, the School provides a continuous education for boys and girls from the age of 4 years until graduation at the age of 18. A full 15 years can be spent at the School, and "Falcon 15ers" receive an award at the end of their schooling.

The School profile on its website describes its aims as promoting traditional values, while looking to the future. In recent years, an ambitious renovation project has been taking place, rewiring and networking the buildings, and upgrading facilities, such as the swimming pool, which is now run on solar energy. In addition to a complete refit of the pool, the gymnasium has been re-roofed and re-floored, and a new climate-control system has been installed.

Examination successes are announced on the School's website, with pass rates comparing very favourably to other similar schools in Cyprus and in the UK. Students tend to choose UK universities as their ultimate destination, with Russell Group Universities a high priority. Students are mainly prepared for UK qualifications at IGCSE/GCSE, and Advanced level for entry to UK and other universities allied to the British system, although a small minority of students choose universities in the US or countries in the EU. In 2016, the School was proud to announce that one of its students was the only undergraduate from Cyprus to gain a place at Oxford University. Each year, the School sends students to Higher Education institutions such as Cambridge, Harvard, Imperial College London, LSE, Manchester, Edinburgh, King's London, UCL, Bath, Bristol, Nottingham, Caltech, MIT, among others.

The Falcon School is one of the most diverse schools in Cyprus, with students coming from a variety of backgrounds including the UK, France, Russia, Lebanon, Egypt, Ukraine, Libya, Spain, Portugal, Brazil, India, the Philippines, and the US. The school takes pupils from all ages (from kindergarten to secondary education).

In 2015, the School was the subject of a documentary-style film produced by MediaBox Productions http://mediabox.com.cy/our-work/the-falcon-school-nicosia-cyprus/

Notable alumni are Apoorv Bhargava, member of the Forbes 30/30 list for 2019; Joanna Loizou of the Research Centre for Molecular Medicine in Austria; Sirine Saba of the Royal Shakespeare Company; Borna Alikhani, winner of a 2007 Documentary Emmy Award; Marlene Angelides, Eurovision Contestant; Roman Kosarev, RT Reporter; Simon Kassianides, Actor; Athena Markides, chairperson of the Young Bar Council.

References

External links
Falcon School Cyprus

British international schools in Asia
Cyprus
Education in Nicosia
International schools in Cyprus
Educational institutions established in 1976
1976 establishments in Cyprus